"I Just Called to Say Goodbye Again" is a song written by Bud McGuire and Paul Nelson and recorded by American country music artist Larry Boone. It was released in October 1988 as the first single from his second album, Swingin' Doors, Sawdust Floors. The song peaked at number 16 on the Billboard Hot Country Singles chart.

Chart performance

References

1988 singles
Larry Boone songs
Mercury Records singles
Songs written by Paul Nelson (songwriter)
Song recordings produced by Ray Baker (music producer)
1988 songs